Torpa (or historically Torpen) is a former municipality in the old Oppland county, Norway. The  municipality existed from 1914 until its dissolution in 1962. The area is now part of Nordre Land Municipality. The administrative centre was the village at Åmot where the Åmot Church is located. Torpa currently constitutes the northern part of the Nordre Land, bordering the municipalities of Etnedal and Nord-Aurdal in the west, Gausdal, Lillehammer, and Gjøvik in the east.

Name

The municipality (and parish) were named Torpen since this is the old name for this area. The meaning of the word þorp is probably "pasture" or "grazing land". Prior to 1918, the name was written "Torpen" and in 1918 it was changed to "Torpa".

History
The municipality of Torpen was established on 1 January 1914 when the large Nordre Land Municipality was divided into two: Torpen (population: 2,219) and Nordre Land (population: 2,570). In 1918, the spelling of the name was changed from Torpen to Torpa. During the 1960s, there were many municipal mergers across Norway due to the work of the Schei Committee. On 1 January 1962, the municipality of Torpa (population: 2,620) was merged with the neighboring municipality of Nordre Land (population: 3,870) and the Tranlia and Store Røen areas (population: 196) of the neighboring Fluberg Municipality  creating a new, larger Nordre Land Municipality.

Government
All municipalities in Norway, including Torpa, are responsible for primary education (through 10th grade), outpatient health services, senior citizen services, unemployment and other social services, zoning, economic development, and municipal roads. The municipality was governed by a municipal council of elected representatives, which in turn elected a mayor.

Municipal council
The municipal council  of Torpa was made up of representatives that were elected to four year terms.  The party breakdown of the final municipal council was as follows:

See also
List of former municipalities of Norway

References

Nordre Land
Former municipalities of Norway
1914 establishments in Norway
1962 disestablishments in Norway